Agyneta llanoensis is a species of sheet weaver found in the United States. It was described by Gertsch & Davis in 1936.

References

llanoensis
Spiders of the United States
Spiders described in 1936